Andrea Mei (born 18 May 1989) is an Italian footballer who plays as a centre-back.

Club career
Mei was signed by Inter Milan in August 2004 along with Luca Gentili.

He was sold to Piacenza Calcio along with Luca Tremolada in co-ownership deal for a total of €1.5 million on 30 June 2010. However Inter also signed Andrea Lussardi and Matteo Colombi from Piacenza in co-ownership deal for the same price. The players returned to their own clubs in June 2011 for the original price.

In summer 2011 he left for Dutch club Venlose Voetbal Vereniging in a temporary deal. His contract with Inter was terminated in January 2013 in mutual consent. Inter had to write down the residual accounting value of the contract for €344,000.

References

External links

1989 births
Living people
Italian footballers
Italy youth international footballers
Italian expatriate footballers
Vis Pesaro dal 1898 players
Inter Milan players
F.C. Lumezzane V.G.Z. A.S.D. players
Piacenza Calcio 1919 players
VVV-Venlo players
Eredivisie players
Serie B players
Serie C players
Expatriate footballers in the Netherlands
Italian expatriate sportspeople in the Netherlands
Association football defenders